Several special routes of U.S. Route 421 exist. In order from south to north they are as follows.

Existing

Wilmington truck route

U.S. Route 421 Truck (US 421 Truck), established on March 2009, is a truck route along Front Street from US 421 (Burnett Boulevard) to the Cape Fear Memorial Bridge.

Sanford business loop

U.S. Route 421 Business (US 421 Bus) is a  multi-lane business loop along Horner Boulevard, through downtown Sanford.  Approved by AASHTO on May 3, 2013, its official establishment is dependent on the completion of the Sanford bypass, which mainline US 421 will be rerouted along, sharing with already established NC 87 Bypass.

North Wilkesboro business loop

U.S. Route 421 Business (US 421 Bus) was established on November, 1969 as a renumbering of all US 421A and part of mainline US 421.  The  route begins along Statesville Avenue heading into downtown North Wilkesboro, where it follows along Main Street, 6th Street, and D Street.  It reconnects with mainline US 421 in Wilkesboro.

Boone truck route

U.S. Route 421 Truck (US 421 Truck), is an alternate route for trucks in Boone, which are not allowed to go through the downtown area.  The route starts south on NC 105 from US 421 King Street to NC Highway 105 Bypass, then back to US 421 west of Boone.  US 221 Truck and US 321 Truck also overlap along the route.

Gate City business loop

U.S. Route 421 Business (US 421 Bus) is a business route of US 421 in Scott County.  The business route is co-existent with US 23 Business and US 58 Business through Gate City.  US 421 Business begins at the east end of the town at an intersection with US 421, US 23 and US 58.  The business route heads west along Kane Street, which crosses Norfolk Southern Railway's Appalachia Division rail line on its way to the downtown area, where the route meets the southern end of SR 71 (Jackson Street).  US 421 Business turns west onto Jackson Street and parallels the rail line to the business route's western end at an interchange with US 421, US 23, and US 58 just west of the western town limit of Gate City.

Former

Wilmington business loop

U.S. Route 421 Business (US 421 Bus) was established by 1970 as a renumbering of mainline US 421 along Third Street to the Isabel Holmes Bridge.  The business loop was decommissioned by 1979.

Clinton alternate route

U.S. Route 421 Alternate (US 421A), was established by 1952 when mainline US 421 was bypassed west.  It followed Lisbon Street and McKay Streets, with a partial overlap with US 701A.  In 1960, the route was renumbered as US 421 Business.

Clinton business loop

U.S. Route 421 Business (US 421 Bus) was established in 1960 as a renumbering of US 421A through downtown Clinton, via Lisbon Street and McKoy Streets.  By 1963 it was decommissioned.

North Wilkesboro alternate route

U.S. Route 421 Alternate (US 421A), was established in 1957 when mainline US 421 was bypassed south through Wilkesboro; the old alignment continued to go through downtown North Wilkesboro via D Street.  On November, 1969, it was renumbered as part of US 421 Business.

See also

References

External links

21-4
21-4
21-4